Life Is Great and Gettin' Better! is an album from Christian duo Jeff & Sheri Easter. It was released on January 23, 2007.

Track listing

 "Life Is Great and Gettin' Better" (Easter, Wright) - 2:45 
 "Livin' in the Rain" (Hawkins, LaBar) - 3:08 
 "Over and Over" (Smith) - 3:52 
 "Joshua's Song" (Easter) - 3:30 
 "Feelin' Alright, Doin' Okay" (Wright) - 3:56 
 "I Wouldn't Change You If I Could" (Jones, Smith) - 3:05 
 "All the Days That End in Why" (Easter) - 4:32 
 "A Lullaby" (Easter) - 3:40 
 "Come See Me" (Gaither, J.) - 4:15 
 "Daddy Hung the Moon" (Westley, Willett) - 4:00 
 "Old Chunk of Coal" (Shaver) - 3:20 
 "Dance" (Willett) - 5:07

Awards

The album was nominated to a Dove Award for Country Album of the Year at the 39th GMA Dove Awards.

References

External links
Life Is Great and Gettin' Better! on Amazon.com

2007 albums